Angamuco is the name given to a major urban settlement of the  Purépecha civilization, now in ruins hidden under vegetation, in the Lake Pátzcuaro Basin of Michoacán, Mexico, and discovered in 2007. Fisher believes the settlement was founded around 900 CE and reached peak importance from around 1000 to around 1350 CE with a population of over 100,000 – making it the most populous city in western Mexico at the time, and spanning a wider area than the Purépecha capital, Tzintzuntzan.

References

Purépecha sites
Archaeological sites in Michoacán